Henry Newland ( – 7 March 1862) was an Anglican clergyman in the Church of Ireland. He was the incumbent at Gorey and Dean of Ferns  from 1842 until his death at age 66.

References 

Alumni of Trinity College Dublin
Deans of Ferns
1862 deaths
1790s births
Date of birth missing